The following radio stations broadcast on FM frequency 87.6 MHz:

Australia

 BOUNTY FM in Norfolk Island
 Raw FM in Canberra, Australian Capital Territory
 2KY in Cootamundra, New South Wales
 2KY in Griffith, New South Wales
 2KY in Young, New South Wales
 Country Mix in Dubbo, New South Wales
 Heartland FM in Mudgee, New South Wales
 Hype FM in Broken Hill, New South Wales
 Indigo FM in Rutherglen, Victoria
 Journey FM in Eden, New South Wales
 Kick 87.6 in Penrith, New South Wales
 Mood FM in Sydney, New South Wales
 Raw FM in Albury, New South Wales
 Raw FM in Goulburn, New South Wales
 Raw FM in Port Macquarie, New South Wales
 Voice of Islam in Lakemba, New South Wales
 Raw FM in Gold Coast, Queensland
 Vision Radio Network in Rockhampton, Queensland
 Vision Radio Network in Charleville, Queensland
 Vision Radio Network in Longreach, Queensland
 Vision Radio Network in Brisbane, Queensland
 Vision Radio Network in Cairns, Queensland
 Vision Radio Network in Kingaroy, Queensland
 Vision Radio Network in Roma, Queensland
 Classic Gold FM in Townsville, Queensland
 FM 876 Network in Melbourne, Victoria
 Kiss FM in Melbourne, Victoria
 Raw FM in Shepparton, Victoria
 Surf FM in Frankston, Victoria
 ValleyFM in Bright, Victoria
 Vision Radio Network in Echuca, Victoria
 Radio Ena in Adelaide, South Australia
 Radio 876 in Normanville, South Australia
 Surf FM in Seaford, Victoria
 Vision Radio Network in Gooseberry Hill, Western Australia
 Wedderburn Visitor Radio in Wedderburn, Victoria 3518

China
 Beijing Wenyi Radio in Beijing
 CNR The Voice of China in Nantong
 CNR Business Radio in Changsha and Yueyang

Greece
Laikos FM at Thessaloniki

Indonesia
Cut FM in Jakarta and Singapore

Malaysia
 8FM in Ipoh, Perak

Netherlands
 Arrow Classic Rock Noord in Enschede, Overijssel
 Radio 4 in Roosendaal, North Brabant

New Zealand
Various low-power stations up to 1 watt

Rwanda
 Radio10 in Kigali, Rwanda

References

Lists of radio stations by frequency